A tinker is an itinerant tinsmith. It may also refer to:

Arts and entertainment

Fictional characters
Tinker, the fictional assistant to detective Sexton Blake in British comic strips and novels
Colonel Tinker, a minor fictional character in the Southern Victory Series novel How Few Remain by Harry Turtledove
Tinker Dill, a fictional character in the British TV series Lovejoy
Tinkers, the main protagonists of Vernor Vinge's book The Peace War
Tuatha'an (or Tinkers) of Robert Jordan's The Wheel of Time
Tinker Knight, a boss in Shovel Knight

Literature
Tinker, a novel by Wen Spencer
Tinkers (novel), the debut novel by Paul Harding
"The Tinker", a short story from Orson Scott Card

Other uses in arts and entertainment
Tinker (band), a Canadian alternative rock band
Tinker!, an American science-fiction film (2018) starring Clayne Crawford
Microsoft Tinker, a puzzle game
Tinker, a 1949 British film directed and co-written by Herbert Marshall

Places
Tinker Air Force Base in Oklahoma
Tinker Cobblestone Farmstead, Henrietta, New York, on the National Register of Historic Places
Tinker Creek, a river in South Carolina
Tinker Creek (Virginia), see List of rivers of Virginia
Tinker (New Brunswick)
Tinker Dam, New Brunswick
Tinker Glacier, Antarctica

People with the name
Tinker (surname)
Tinker Fox (1610–1650), Parliamentarian colonel during the English Civil War, nicknamed "Tinker"
Tinker Hatfield (born 1952), Nike shoe designer
Tinker Juarez (born 1961), former Bicycle Motocross (BMX) racer and current mountain bike racer, nicknamed "Tinker"
Tinker Owens (born 1954), American former National Football League player nicknamed "Tinker"

Sports arenas
Tinker Field, a baseball stadium in Orlando, Florida, named for Hall-of-Fame baseball player Joe Tinker
Tinker Park, a former baseball ground in Indianapolis, Indiana, named for Tinker Street

Other uses
Tinker (software), software for molecular dynamics simulation
Tinker, the UK's first medical diabetes alert dog
Tinker Building, Orlando, Florida, on the National Register of Historic Places
Tinker Federal Credit Union, a credit union headquartered in Oklahoma City, Oklahoma
Tinker v. Des Moines Independent Community School District, a 1969 Supreme Court case
 Tinkers or The Tinkers, an alternate (and often pejorative) name for the itinerant people in Europe, including Irish Travellers, Romani (Gypsies), and Scottish Travellers

See also
Gypsy Vanner horse, also known as the Tinker horse
Tink (disambiguation)
"Tinker, Tailor," a traditional nursery rhyme
Tinker, Tailor, Soldier, Spy
Tinker Bell, fairy companion of Peter Pan

Lists of people by nickname